Lichnasthenus armiventris is a species of beetle in the family Carabidae, the only species in the genus Lichnasthenus.

References

Lebiinae